FC Bruno's Magpies, also known as FC Magpies in UEFA competition, is a football team from Gibraltar. They play in the Gibraltar National League and the Rock Cup.

History
The club was formed in 2013, initially as a group of friends who drank at the Bruno's Bar & Restaurant (A bar in Gibraltar). In its first two seasons, the club achieved respectable mid-table finishes in the Gibraltar Second Division. Mick Embleton was appointed the first manager of the team and was instrumental in the initial setting up/ organizing/ managing of the squad.

With the introduction of Chestertons, a Gibraltarian real estate agent, as the sponsor in 2015/16, the intent grew more serious, with moves to professionalise the club and establish a fanbase with the introduction of matchday programs and incentives for fans who attended games. The club finished fourth in that season and were the runners-up in the Second Division Cup, losing in extra time to Second Division champions Europa Point.

In October 2016, the club appointed Davie Wilson as manager, who has previously been assistant-manager the Gibraltar national football team and had recently departed Gibraltar Premier Division side Lions. The club enjoyed a dominant start to the campaign, however a faltering winter saw them embroiled in a title race with the resurgent Gibraltar Phoenix. Ending the season in second place, they entered the play-off with Manchester 62, who finished 9th in the 2016–17 Gibraltar Premier Division. However, a 3–1 defeat ensured that The Magpies will remain in the Second Division next season.

In August 2017, the club announced a new sponsorship deal with GVC Holdings. The side finished 3rd in the league that season, however, in May 2019 they completed a league and cup double, securing the Second Division title while also winning the Second Division Cup. After the season concluded, the club announced that former Watford chairman and British Olympian Haig Oundjian had purchased a stake in the club and become co-chairman with Louis Perry.

Current squad

First team
As of 8 January 2023.First Team Squad Bruno's Magpies. Retrieved 10 July 2022.

Out on loan

Intermediate team
Players registered to play in the Gibraltar Intermediate League. First team players over the age of 23 may sometimes play in games.

Club staff

Club achievements
Second Division Cup: 2018–19
Best league finish – 4th, Gibraltar National League: 2021–22
GFA Challenge Trophy: 2020–21

European recordAccurate as of match played 14 July 2022''

Legend: GF = Goals For. GA = Goals Against. GD = Goal Difference.

Notes
 1Q: First qualifying round

References

External links 
 Official Twitter account
 Official Facebook page
 Matchday programme

Football clubs in Gibraltar
Gibraltar National League clubs
2013 establishments in Gibraltar
Association football clubs established in 2013